The 1928 Swedish Ice Hockey Championship was the seventh season of the Swedish Ice Hockey Championship, the national championship of Sweden. IK Gota won the championship.

Tournament

Qualification 
 Djurgårdens IF - Karlbergs BK 5:0

Semifinals 
 IK Göta - Djurgårdens IF 6:2
 Södertälje SK - Hammarby IF 6:2

Final 
 IK Göta - Södertälje SK 4:3

External links
 Season on hockeyarchives.info

Cham
Swedish Ice Hockey Championship seasons